Horace Alfred "Hod" Fenner (July 12, 1897 – November 20, 1954) was a pitcher in Major League Baseball. He played for the Chicago White Sox in 1921.

References

External links

1897 births
1954 deaths
Major League Baseball pitchers
Chicago White Sox players
Kalamazoo Celery Pickers players
Kalamazoo Hornets baseball players
Baseball players from Michigan